Sibylla of Lusignan (or Sibylle de Lusignan) (October/November 1198 – c. 1230 or 1252) was a queen consort of Armenia. She was the daughter of King Aimery of Cyprus and Queen Isabella I of Jerusalem. She was a member of the House of Lusignan.

She was the second wife of King Leo I of Armenia, married in 1210, by whom she had one daughter, Isabella.

Notes

References

Armenian people of Cypriot descent
Women of the Crusader states
Armenian queens consort
House of Lusignan
1198 births
13th-century deaths
13th-century Cypriot people
Daughters of kings